Poříčany is a municipality and village in Kolín District in the Central Bohemian Region of the Czech Republic. It has about 1,500 inhabitants.

In popular culture
Some scenes of the movie Hostel (2005) were filmed in the municipality.

References

Villages in Kolín District